Javier Guerrero may refer to:

Javier Guerrero García (born 1958), Mexican politician
Javier Guerrero (Spanish politician)